The 1978 All-Big Eight Conference football team consists of American football players chosen by various organizations for All-Big Eight Conference teams for the 1978 NCAA Division I-A football season.  The selectors for the 1978 season included the Associated Press (AP).

Offensive selections

Quarterbacks
 Thomas Lott, Oklahoma (AP)

Running backs
 Billy Sims, Oklahoma (AP)
 Richard Berns, Nebraska (AP)
 Dexter Green, Iowa State (AP)

Tight ends
 Junior Miller, Nebraska (AP)

Centers
 Peter Allard, Missouri (AP)

Offensive guards
 Greg Roberts, Oklahoma (AP)
 Steve Lindquist, Nebraska (AP)

Offensive tackles
 Matt Miller, Colorado (AP)
 Kelvin Clark, Nebraska (AP)

Wide receivers
 Charlie Green, Kansas State (AP)

Defensive selections

Defensive ends
 Reggie Mathis, Oklahoma (AP)
 George Andrews, Nebraska (AP)

Defensive tackles
 Mike Stensrud, Iowa State (AP)
 Phil Tabor, Oklahoma (AP)

Nose guards
 Reggie Kinlaw, Oklahoma (AP)

Linebackers
 Darryl Hunt, Oklahoma (AP)
 George Cumby, Oklahoma (AP)
 John Corker, Oklahoma State (AP)

Defensive backs
 Darrol Ray, Oklahoma (AP)
 Mark Haynes, Colorado (AP)
 Jim Pillen, Nebraska (AP)

Special teams

Place-kicker
 Uwe von Schamann, Oklahoma (AP)

Punter
 Mike Hubach, Kansas (AP)

Key

AP = Associated Press

See also
 1978 College Football All-America Team

References

All-Big Seven Conference football team
All-Big Eight Conference football teams